The 1919 Invercargill mayoral election was held on 30 April 1919 as part of that year's local elections.

Incumbent mayor John Stead was re-elected with a reduced majority.

Results
The following table gives the election results:

References

1919 elections in New Zealand
Mayoral elections in Invercargill